The World Cup Bridge is a bridge under construction that is planned to cross the Han River in South Korea and connect Mapo District and Yeongdeungpo District.

Construction on the bridge began in March 2010 and was originally slated to be completed by August 2015, but budget cuts have slowed its pace.

The bridge is intended to connect the Seobu Expressway to Mapo District.

References

Buildings and structures in Seoul
Bridges under construction